The 1987 Haryana Legislative Assembly election was held in the Indian state of Haryana to elect 90 members of the state's legislative assembly.

Results

!colspan=10|
|-
!colspan=2|Party
!Candidates
!Seats won
!Votes
!Vote %
|-
| 
|align="left"|Lok Dal||69||60||2,349,397||38.58%
|-
| 
|align="left"|Bharatiya Janata Party||20||16||613,819||10.08%
|-
| 
|align="left"|Indian National Congress||90||5||1,776,820||29.18%
|-
| 
|align="left"|Communist Party of India (Marxist)||4||1||47,434||0.78%
|-
| 
|align="left"|Communist Party of India||5||1||32,738||0.54%
|-
| 
|align="left"|Independents||1045||7||1,128,803||18.54%
|-
!colspan=2| Total !! 1322 !! 90 !! 6,089,130 !!
|-
|}

Elected members

References

1987
1987
Haryana